Schwarzer See (literally "Black Lake") may refer to:

in Brandenburg, Germany
Schwarzer See (Rheinsberg)
in Mecklenburg-Vorpommern, Germany
Schwarzer See (Granitz)
Schwarzer See (Mildenitz)
Schwarzer See (Schlemmin)
Schwarzer See (Schwarz)
Schwarzer See (Zickhusen)

See also
Schwarzsee (disambiguation)
Black Lake (disambiguation)